Richard Arthur Allan Browne (August 11, 1917 – June 4, 1989) was an American cartoonist, best known for writing and drawing Hägar the Horrible and Hi and Lois.

Biography
Browne attended Cooper Union and got his start at the New York Journal-American as a copy boy and later worked in the art department. He also worked as a courtroom sketch artist for the paper, covering the Lucky Luciano trial. He joined the army, producing work for the engineering unit and created Ginny Jeep, a comic strip about the Women's Army Corps.

During World War II, he was assigned to draw maps and charts for an Army engineering unit, eventually rising to staff sergeant. In his spare time, he created the comic "Ginny Jeep", appearing in Army and Air Force newspapers.

In the 1940s, he worked as an illustrator for Newsweek as well as for an advertising company, where he created the trademark logo for Chiquita.

In 1954, Browne and cartoonist Mort Walker co-created the comic strip Hi and Lois, a spin-off of Walker's popular Beetle Bailey strip, featuring Beetle's sister, brother-in-law and their family. Walker wrote the strip, which Browne illustrated until his death. The series is now drawn by his son Chance and written by Walker's sons. In 1973, Browne created Hägar the Horrible about an ill-mannered red-bearded medieval viking. The comic was then produced by his son Chris until 2023. Both strips have been successful, appearing in hundreds of newspapers for decades.

Browne died of cancer on June 4, 1989, at the age of 71, in Sarasota, Florida.

Awards
Browne was recognized for his work by the National Cartoonists Society with their Humor Comics Strip Award in 1959, 1960, 1972 and 1977 for Hi and Lois, and again in 1984 and 1986 for Hägar the Horrible. He received their Reuben Award for Hi and Lois in 1962 and for Hägar the Horrible in 1973. That same year the NCS honored him with their Elzie Segar Award.

References

Sources
Strickler, Dave. Syndicated Comic Strips and Artists, 1924-1995: The Complete Index. Cambria, California: Comics Access, 1995. 
Social Security Death Index

External links
 Dik Browne biography at Lambiek.net
 NCS Awards
 
Billy Ireland Cartoon Library & Museum Art Database

1917 births
1989 deaths
American people of Norwegian descent
American comic strip cartoonists
American comics artists
Courtroom sketch artists
Reuben Award winners
Artists from New York City
Cooper Union alumni
United States Army personnel of World War II
United States Army soldiers